Dr Brian Sherratt OBE JP FIMgt FRSA is a political science researcher with a particular interest in Whitehall bureaucracy and the role of the permanent secretary.

Formerly he was Headmaster (1984–2005) of Great Barr School a secondary school on Aldridge Road in Great Barr, Birmingham, England for children aged 11 to 19. During his time as Headmaster, Great Barr was the largest school in the UK.

Acclaim 
He is acclaimed with making Great Barr School one of the best in the country until his formal retirement from the school in August 2005.

Under Sherratt's leadership, Great Barr was noted as a school with very high standards of pupil behaviour and pupil achievement. For these reasons, the school was heavily oversubscribed by parents on first choices. Visiting Great Barr School in November 1999, Sir Chris Woodhead, the then Chief Inspector of Schools, said "You have here an outstanding city comprehensive school – it is one of the most impressive schools I have visited. Great Barr School shows it is possible for a comprehensive school to give a very high quality of education". He added that "the secret of the school's success is strong, assertive leadership from the headteacher".

Brian Sherratt was awarded the OBE for services to education in the 1995 New Years Honours

Sherratt was noted for providing his deputy heads with training and professional opportunities to equip them for headship. Among those who, over the years, worked as deputy heads under Brian Sherratt's leadership are Jenny Hawkins, who became Director of Education for Staffordshire, Carol Whitty, Deputy General Secretary of NAHT, John Martin, Head of Warley High School, Sandwell, Dame Maureen Brennan, Head of Barr Beacon School and formerly Head of Hillcrest School and Community College in Netherton, West Midlands, Ian Fraser, Head of Ashfield School, Nottingham, Glen Goddard, Head of Menzies High School, West Bromwich, Neil Finlay, Head of Walton High School, Stafford, Billy Downie, Head of The Streetly School, Sutton Coldfield, Kate Abbott, formerly Head of The Bluecoat School, Walsall and subsequently Head of Great Barr School.

Earlier career 
Earlier in his career Brian Sherratt had worked in grammar and comprehensive schools and was a lecturer at Avery Hill College, now part of the University of Greenwich.

Before taking up the headship of Great Barr School in 1984, Sherratt was Headmaster and Warden (1979–1984) of Kirk Hallam School and Community Centre, (now Kirk Hallam Community Technology College), Ilkeston, Derbyshire. In February 1983 Kirk Hallam School underwent a full inspection by Her Majesty's Inspectorate, Department for Education and Science, Report by HM Inspectors on Kirk Hallam Comprehensive School, Ilkeston, Derbyshire, 7–11 February 1983, S910/4135/04 196/83 SZ 20/83. This was one of the first published inspection reports as introduced by Sir Keith Joseph during his time as Secretary of State for Education and Science. The inspection by a team of 19 HMIs was described by Sherratt as "the most penetrating and analytical in which I have ever been involved". In paragraph 18 of the published report HMI state that Kirk Hallam School "is to be commended upon its breadth of vision in the planning of its curriculum" (18.2, p 16). In paragraph 18.4, p 17 the report states that "The management of the school is outstandingly good". Publication of this report received wide coverage in the press including the Times Educational Supplement the Ilkeston Advertiser and the Derby Evening Telegraph.

Other interests 

Apart from running a very large school Sherratt demonstrated an active interest in environmental issues and was a director of ENCAMS from 1998 to 2005 and vice-chairman of ENCAMS from 2003 to 2005. In addition he was Chairman of the ENCAMS Devolution Committee (2004–2005). He was also a member of the ENCAMS Resources Committee (2002–2003), Audit Committee (2003–2005) and Trustee of the ENCAMS Pension Fund (1999–2005).

From 1997–2001 he was Chairman of the Eco-Schools Advisory Panel and also Chairman of the Green Code for Schools Advisory Panel (1998–2005). In 1999 he received the Queen Mother's Birthday Award for the Environment.

Sherratt was widely respected as a scholar and in 2005 received the BELMAS (British Educational Leadership Management and Administration Society) Award for the Best PhD Thesis of the Year. In the same year he also received the George Cadbury Prize in Education from the University of Birmingham.

From 1986 to 1990 he was a member of the Court of the University of Birmingham and from 1988 an honorary lecturer in the School of Education. In 2002 he became an honorary lecturer at the University of Bristol and a visiting lecturer at the University of Asmara, Eritrea, where, with Dr Teame Mebrahtu, he led a programme of professional development for secondary heads throughout the country funded by the Danish aide programme, Danida.

From 2003 to 2005 he was a member of the Education Commission.

In 2012 he received the Freedom of the City of London. In 2003 he was elected a Freeman of the Guild of Educators and thereafter (2012) a Liveryman.

School Leadership Lab 

The School Leadership Lab – www.schoolleadershiplab.co.uk – was an on-line resource "for school leaders, for those interested in becoming school leaders, for governors, teachers and for those with a general interest in schools and education". It was set up in 2012 by Brian Sherratt and edited by him until 2015.

The School Leadership Lab covered a wide range of topics relating to school leadership and governance.
The website contained factual information, opinion and advice. Further features included an RSS news feed ticker which displayed headlines relating to education and a News Section where comments were posted relating to current developments in education.

School Leadership Lab was relevant to the leadership of both state and independent schools.

Published work 

Local Education Authorities Project [LEAP 2] (BBC 1988) The Locally Managed School (with Hywell Thomas). This BBC training programme was designed to support governors, school heads and senior staff in training associated with the introduction of local management of schools following the implementation of the Education Reform Act 1988.

‘Opting for Freedom: a stronger policy on grant-maintained schools’, Policy Study No 138, Centre for Policy Studies, 1994. This trenchant policy study arguably represents Brian Sherratt at his most influential in shaping the views of policy makers. He argued that, whereas the grant-maintained schools policy offered schools the chance of freedom from LEA control, the government's own hesitations over the policy were being exploited by members of the interest groups – heads, bureaucrats, and officials – whose present careers and future ambitions depended on the LEA system. The procedure for becoming grant-maintained had been allowed to develop into an obstacle course, while imposed central restrictions (such as the National Curriculum) meant that grant-maintained status in fact offered limited independence. Sherratt argued that government should aim to make all schools grant-maintained (i.e. independent of LEA control) as a matter of general policy, and that it should loosen the constraints placed on grant-maintained schools so as to make diversity and choice in education a reality.

Grant-Maintained Status: considering the options, Longman, 1994. In this book Sherratt examines the nature of the grant-maintained policy and its implementation; the implications of self-government and the benefits of grant-maintained status; the role of the Funding Agency for Schools and the Common Funding Formula. The book also looks at the obstacles that there had been to implementing the policy and suggests some necessary changes to overcome them.

A Structured Approach to School and Staff Development: from theory to practice (1996) – with John Wyatt. This book considers the relationships between school aims and values, whole school review, appraisal, school development planning, value for money in school planning and school evaluation.

Headteacher Appraisal (contrib, Arena, in association with the NAHT, 1997). In this book, Brian Sherratt writes about his experience of being appraised as the head of a large secondary school. He comments on the effect it had on his view of his job, and the impact it made on the school as a whole.

Radical Educational Policies and Secretaries of State (with Peter Ribbins, Cassell 1997). In this book Sherratt and Ribbins argue that the post-war consensus on the purpose of education, and the role played by the Secretary of State in defining it, had all but collapsed. In a series of conversations with Secretaries of State, the nature of the unfolding agenda for educational reform which the Conservative Party had developed since 1979 is explored. The authors present a series of portraits of seven very different people: Mark Carlisle, Keith Joseph, Kenneth Baker, Kenneth Clarke, John MacGregor, John Patten and Gillian Shephard, revealing the ways in which they sought to define and deliver educational change against a backdrop of conflicting messages from within their own party, and in the face of determined opposition from much of the educational establishment. These illuminating, entertaining and provocative conversations suggest that what was once regarded as radical in the Conservative agenda for education is now increasingly taken for granted by allies and opponents alike. Including a thorough analysis of the seven interviews, this book provides a mine of information for all those interested in contemporary politics, the future of education and the workings of government.

Policy, Leadership and Professional Knowledge in Education (contrib, Chapman, BEMAS, 1999).

Journal of Education Policy, The role of the Chancellor of the Exchequer in the making of educational policy: Kenneth Baker and the Lawson factor? Volume 19, No 6, November 2004 (with Peter Ribbins). Until this paper, the role of Chancellors of the Exchequer in the making of policy in education has attracted the attention of few researchers, and little has been published that seeks systematically and comprehensively to examine this issue. This is remarkable given that, for most of the last 25 years, this office has been filled by four unusually powerful and long-serving figures. In this paper, Sherratt and Ribbins, drawing on their interview-based studies of the Secretaries of State and of the Permanent Secretaries who have held office at the Department of Education since 1979, consider the influence of Prime Ministers and Chancellors on educational policy over these years. In this context, the bulk of this paper focuses on the role of Nigel Lawson in the making of the 1988 Education Reform Act. In doing so, it draws on face-to-face interviews with Lawson along with other key participants such as Kenneth Baker and David Hancock. It concludes that, although Lawson may not have been, as he had hoped to be, the architect of the Act, he did exercise an important influence in shaping many of its central characteristics. As such, his claim that he was the catalyst of reform may well be justified.

'Managing the Secondary School in the 1990s: A New View of Headship' with Peter Ribbins, Educational Management and Administration.. This paper, which has been influential among researchers, talks about 'a new approach to the study of headship in which they have been involved together; an approach which they describe as a dialectic of biography and autobiography'.

Education Administration Management & Leadership (EMAL) special celebratory edition, 40(5) 544 – 55 (2012) (with Peter Ribbins). 'Permanent Secretaries, consensus and centrism in national policy making in education'

Journal of Education and History, Volume 45,  Issue 1, 28–48 (2013) (with Peter Ribbins) ‘The permanent secretary as policy-maker, shaper, taker, sharer, and resister in education – reflections on Sir James Hamilton as a centralising outsider'

International Studies in Educational Administration, Volume 41, No , 105–122 (2013) (with Peter Ribbins) 
‘Leading Education in the United Kingdom:  a study of the policy and personal relationship of selected permanent secretaries and their Secretaries of State’.

Public Policy and Administration (June 2014) (with Peter Ribbins) 'Reforming the Civil Service and revising the role of the mandarin in Britain: A view from the perspective of a study of eight permanent secretaries at the Ministry of Education between 1976and 2011'.

Successor 

Dr Sherratt's successor as head of Great Barr School is Kate Abbott who also prides herself in promoting the strong values which he established and maintained throughout his time as head. She was Curriculum Deputy at Great Barr before leaving to take up the headship of Bluecoat School, Walsall. She returned as head to Great Barr in September 2005.

Current positions 

From 2006 to 2012 Dr Sherratt was a magistrate on the Nottingham Bench (Adult Court and Youth Court) and from 2009 to 2012 a Magistrate Training Observer. Since 2005 he has been a member of the Academic Advisory Council of the University of Buckingham. From 2005–2011 he was a director of Nottingham Park Estate Ltd(a company limited by guarantee) and from 2008–2011 its chairman.

Personal 

Brian Sherratt was born in Oxford on 28 May 1942. In August 1966 he married (Pauline) Brenda Hargreaves from Leeds. They have two sons and two daughters. Apart from his continuing studies in the field of political science, he has a particular interest in the music of Richard Wagner. Education: University of Leeds (BA, PGCE); University of London (AcDipEd, MA); University of Birmingham (PhD).

References 

Living people
1942 births
Officers of the Order of the British Empire
Heads of schools in England
Alumni of the University of Birmingham
People from Great Barr